= Golden Globe Award for Best Supporting Actress =

Golden Globe Award for Best Supporting Actress may refer to:

- Golden Globe Award for Best Supporting Actress – Motion Picture
- Golden Globe Award for Best Supporting Actress – Series, Miniseries or Television Film
